James Leslie  was an eighteenth-century Anglican bishop in Ireland.

Leslie was born in 1706 at Tarbert, County Kerry, son of James Leslie and Sarah Kelly, and educated at Trinity College, Dublin. He was Curate at Swords then Perpetual curate at St Nicholas Within, Dublin and finally Rector of Lamesley. In 1755 he became Bishop of Limerick, Ardfert and Aghadoe, serving until his death on 24 November 1770. He lived at Tarbert House, which his family built about 1690, and which still stands.

He married Joyce Lyster, daughter of Anthony  Lyster of Lysterfield, County Roscommon and Elizabeth Warren, by whom he was the father of a numerous family, including Sir Edward Leslie (1744–1818), 1st and last of the Leslie Baronets  of Tarbert, Richard Leslie, Archdeacon of Aghadoe (died 1804), Martha (died 1831), who married James Lowry of Rockdale, County Tyrone, and Catherine, who married James Scott of Willsborough, County Londonderry.

References

18th-century Anglican bishops in Ireland
Bishops of Limerick, Ardfert and Aghadoe
1695 deaths
Clergy from County Kerry
Alumni of Trinity College Dublin